is a 3D mecha fighting game developed by Sega AM3 (formerly Hitmaker) and published by Sega. It was released in Japanese arcades only on the Sega Hikaru arcade system board in 2001. Following its initial release, there was initially no home console port of the game due to the Hikaru's superior graphical capabilities. A region free home port of the game was released for Xbox 360 on December 22, 2010.

Gameplay

Force differs from previous versions of the series in that it features 4-players, 2-on-2 team matches. The battle system is heavily simplified from the game's predecessor, Oratorio Tangram, in order to balance the increased number of players. The left-turbo function is removed, and the speed is significantly slower. The game website states this as a side-effect of the V-converters being less efficient than the Mars crystals. The machine uses a magnetic card system to record player data, with the cards being called a "VO4 Pilot's License". Players start by choosing a base Virtuaroid, which will open up other variants in its family tree as the player plays more of the game. Because of this design, a large number of Virtuaroid variants exist, and the game has the largest VR roster of any game in the series name so far.

The VO4 Pilot's License can be used with the VO4 Terminal, which lets players view records, set the pilot name, swap color schemes or use another available Virtuaroid. During the lifespan of the game, an upgraded version named Virtual On Force M.S.B.S. Ver7.7, with new Virtuaroids, new stages and new magnetic card face designs.

Virtual-On Marz can be considered the spiritual home console version of Force, since Marz took its rules, stages and the Virtuaroids from Force, though without support for 4-player matches and only taking a select few Virtuaroids, while leaving most of the variants out due to storage constraints of the game.

Xbox 360 version
The Xbox 360 version retains the same gameplay as the original series, only with a few inclusions: 2 on 2 Leader Battles, co-op boss fight mode, a Mission mode and Xbox Live support for online play. Battles have local 2 player splitscreen or up to 4 player over System Link. The game also has a special Collector's edition which includes a booklet called Virtual On Chronicle 15, that looks back at 15 years of Virtual-On, and a six disc soundtrack called Virtual On Official Sound Data. All of the items come packaged in a box with artwork from Hajime Katoki. Jaguarandi is now available as a hidden character, along with Apharmd the Hatter based on Apharmd J. However, Ajim, which was a playable character in Oratorio Tangram, is not playable in this Force version. The split-screen gameplay, which was absent from Xbox Live Arcade version of Oratorio Tangram, makes a return in this version. Preordering of the games allows access and download a special "Thorax" item that adjusts the bust sizes of both female Virtualoids: Fei-Yen and Angelan.

References

External links
Virtual-ON Force Official Site 
Xbox 360 Version Official Site 
Virtual-ON Force at GameFAQs

2001 video games
Arcade video games
Japan-exclusive video games
Sega arcade games
Sega video games
Virtual On
Xbox 360 games
Video games developed in Japan

ja:電脳戦機バーチャロン